Carlos Gruezo may refer to:

Carlos Gruezo (footballer, born 1975), former Ecuadorian footballer
Carlos Gruezo (footballer, born 1995), Ecuadorian footballer